Harry Roberts may refer to:

Harry Roberts (cricketer) (1924–1995), English cricketer
Harry Roberts (criminal) (born 1936), English convicted of the Shepherd's Bush murders
Harry Roberts (footballer, born 1904) (1904–1968), English football defender
Harry Roberts (footballer, born 1907) (1907–1984), England international football forward
Brian Roberts (English footballer) aka Harry Roberts (born 1955), Coventry and Birmingham defender
Harry Roberts (inventor), Swedish inventor
Harry Roberts (rugby union, born 1939), Australian international rugby union player
Harry Roberts (rugby union, born 1960), South African international rugby union player
Harry R. Roberts (died 1924), Australian stage actor
Harry V. Roberts (1923–2004), statistician
Rags Roberts (Harry Hamlet Roberts, 1895–1963), American Negro leagues baseball player

See also
Henry Roberts (disambiguation)
Harold Roberts (disambiguation)